Vladimir Nikolayevich Bubnov (born June 26, 1940) is a Russian professional football coach and a former player. He currently works with the children's teams of FC Moscow.

Bubnov played in the Soviet First League with FC Traktor Volgograd.

External links
Profile at Footballfacts.ru

1940 births
Living people
Soviet footballers
FC Rotor Volgograd players
FC Energiya Volzhsky players
Soviet football managers
Russian football managers
FC Rotor Volgograd managers
FC Tekstilshchik Kamyshin managers
Association football forwards